The 2018 Giro d'Italia was the 101st edition of the Giro d'Italia, one of cycling's Grand Tours. The first half of the Giro began in Jerusalem, Israel on 4 May with an individual time trial; the second half's Stage 12, a hilly stage starting from Osimo, occurred on 17 May. The race finished in Rome on 27 May.

Stage 12
17 May 2018 – Osimo to Imola,

Stage 13
18 May 2018 – Ferrara to Nervesa della Battaglia,

Stage 14
19 May 2018 – San Vito al Tagliamento to Monte Zoncolan, 

The stage departed north, through Dignano, to the  Category 3 climb of the Monte di Ragogna. The descent was followed by an intermediate sprint at Forgaria nel Friuli. The route then turned east, then north and finally west to the  Category 3 climb to Avaglio and a descent east through Caneva. An intermediate sprint followed at Paularo, which was immediately followed by the  Category 2 climb of the Passo Duron. After a descent to Sutrio, the riders climbed the  Category 3 route to Sella Valcalda in Ravascletto.

Stage 15
20 May 2018 – Tolmezzo to Sappada,

Rest day 3
21 May 2018 – Trento

Stage 16
22 May 2018 – Trento to Rovereto,  (ITT)

A number of riders were penalised for drafting during the stage including Fabio Aru and Diego Ulissi who finished in the top ten.

Stage 17
23 May 2018 – Riva del Garda to Iseo,

Stage 18
24 May 2018 – Abbiategrasso to Prato Nevoso,

Stage 19
25 May 2018 – Venaria Reale to Bardonecchia,

Stage 20
26 May 2018 – Susa to Cervinia,

Stage 21
27 May 2018 – Rome to Rome,

References

2018 Giro d'Italia
Giro d'Italia stages